is a passenger railway station located in the city of Toyooka, Hyōgo Prefecture, Japan, operated by West Japan Railway Company (JR West).

Lines

Station layout
The station consists of two ground-level opposed side platforms connected by a footbridge. The station is unattended.

Platforms

Adjacent stations

History
Gembudō Station opened as a provisional stop on March 2, 1912 and was elevated to a full passenger station on April 21, 1918. With the privatization of the Japan National Railways (JNR) on April 1, 1987, the station came under the aegis of the West Japan Railway Company.

Passenger statistics
In fiscal 2016, the station was used by an average of 32 passengers daily

Surrounding area
 Gembudō caves

See also
List of railway stations in Japan

References

External links

 Station Official Site

Railway stations in Hyōgo Prefecture
Sanin Main Line
Railway stations in Japan opened in 1918
Toyooka, Hyōgo